Timeless is a greatest hits album by Indonesian band Ungu. It was released on May 9, 2012 by Trinity Optima Production. The album compiled ten songs from six previous studio albums with four newest songs, "Apa Sih Maumu", "Kau Anggap Apa", "Sayang" and "Puing Kenangan". In marketing this album, Ungu and the record label working with KFC that this album would be circulated in all KFC stores in Indonesia.

Track listing

References 

2012 compilation albums